Osage Township is a township in Webster County, in the U.S. state of Missouri. In 2022, it was created from the portion of East Ozark Township north of Route 38, with the remainder becoming Hubble Township. Osage Township takes its name from the Osage River, the headwaters of which run through the township.

References

Townships in Missouri
Townships in Webster County, Missouri